The 1976 Jordanian  League (known as The Jordanian  League,   was the 26th season of Jordan  League since its inception in 1944.In the 1976 it was called (first division league)  Al-Faisaly won its 16th title. It was the first season  for Al-Wehdat in the Premier League, which then was relegated after a play-out match with Al Jazeera.

Teams

Map

League table 

 Al-Wehdat  relegated after a play-out match with Al-Jazeera  (1-2).

Overview
Al-Faysali won the championship.

References
RSSSF

External links
 Jordan Football Association website

Jordanian Pro League seasons
Jordan
Jordan
football